Classification of sleep disorders, as developed in the 19th century, used primarily three categories: Insomnia, Hypersomnia and Nightmare. In the 20th century, increasingly in the last half of it, technological discoveries led to rapid advances in the understanding of sleep and recognition of sleep disorders. Major sleep disorders were defined following the development of Electroencephalography (EEG) in 1924 by Hans Berger.

Three systems of classification are in use worldwide:
 the International classification of diseases (ICD) developed by the World Health Organization (WHO) and intended for use by general and more specialized practitioners,
 the Diagnostic and Statistical Manual (DSM) from the American Psychiatric Association (APA) for psychiatrists and general practitioners, and 
 the International classification of sleep disorders (ICSD), an advanced system cultured by the American Academy of Sleep Medicine (AASM) for sleep specialists.
The ICD and DSM lump different disorders together while the ICSD tends to split related disorders into multiple discrete categories. There has, over the last 60 years, occurred a slow confluence of the three systems of classification.

Diagnoses of sleep disorders are based on self-assessment questionnaires, clinical interview, physical examination and laboratory procedures. The validity and reliability of various sleep disorders are yet to be proved and need further research within the ever-changing field of "Sleep Medicine". Admittedly, the development of sleep disorder classification remains as much an art as it is a science.

History

Milestones 
The first book on sleep was published in 1830 by Robert MacNish; it described sleeplessness, nightmares, sleepwalking and sleep-talking. Narcolepsy, hypnogogic hallucination, wakefulness and somnolence were mentioned by other authors of the nineteenth century. Westphal in 1877 described first case of narcolepsy, the name coined later by Gelineu in 1880 in association with cataplexy. Lehermitte called it paroxysmal hypersomnia in 1930 to differentiate it from prolonged hypersomnia. Roger in 1932 coined the term parasomnia and classified hypersomnia, insomnia and parasomnia. Kleitman in 1939 recognized types of parasomnias as nightmares, night terrors, somniloquy (sleep-talking), somnambulism (sleepwalking), grinding of teeth, jactatians, enuresis, delirium, nonepileptic convulsions and personality dissociation. Broughton in 1968 developed classification of the arousal disorders as confusional arousals: night terrors and sleep walking. Insomnias were classified as primary and secondary until 1970 when they were recognized as symptoms of other disorders. Sir William Osler in 1906 correlated snoring, obesity and somnolence (sleepiness) to Dicken's description of Joe. Charles Burwell in 1956 recognized obstructive sleep apnea as Pickwickian syndrome. Circadian rhythm sleep disorders were discovered in 1981 by Weitzman as delayed sleep phase syndrome in contrast to advanced sleep phase syndrome in 1979.

Evolution of classifications of sleep disorders

The International Classification of Sleep Disorders (ICSD) 

The International Classification of Sleep Disorders (ICSD) was produced by the American Academy of Sleep Medicine (AASM) in association with the European Sleep Research Society, the Japanese Society of Sleep Research, and the Latin American Sleep Society. The classification was developed as a revision and update of the Diagnostic Classification of Sleep and Arousal Disorders (DCSAD) that was produced by both the Association of Sleep Disorders Centers (ASDC) and the Association for the Psychophysiological Study of Sleep and was published in the journal Sleep in 1979.
 Disorder of initiating and maintain sleep (DIMS) - Insomnias
 Disorder of Excessive sleep (DOES) - Hypersomnias
 Disorder of sleep wake schedule
 Parasomnias
The International Classification of Sleep Disorders (ICSD) uses a multiaxial system for stating and coding diagnoses both in clinical reports or for data base purposes. The axial system uses International Classification of Diseases (ICD-9- CM) coding wherever possible. Additional codes are included for procedures and physical signs of particular interest to sleep disorders clinicians and researchers. Diagnoses and procedures are listed and coded on three main "axes." The axial system is arranged as follows:

Axis A ICSD Classification of Sleep Disorders

Axis B ICD-9-CM Classification of Procedures

Axis C ICD-9-CM Classification of Diseases (nonsleep diagnoses).

ICSD - I Revised 1997

Dyssomnias 
 Intrinsic Sleep Disorders
 Extrinsic Sleep Disorders
 Circadian Rhythm Sleep Disorders

Parasomnias 
 Arousal Disorders
 Sleep-Wake Transition Disorders
 Parasomnias Usually Associated with REM Sleep
 Other Parasomnias

Sleep Disorders Associated with Mental, Neurologic, or Other Medical Disorders 
 Associated with Mental Disorders
 Associated with Neurologic Disorders
 Associated with Other Medical Disorders

Proposed Sleep Disorders 

ICSD 2 is tabulated in the main article International Classification of Sleep Disorders

ICSD - 3 

The last edition of ICSD-3 is a unified classification of sleep disorders. It includes seven major categories: insomnia disorders, sleep-related breathing disorders, central disorders of hypersomnolence, circadian rhythm sleep-wake disorders, sleep-related movement disorders, parasomnias, and other sleep disorders. Each of these categories has several subgroups:

1. Insomnia
 Chronic insomnia disorder
 Short-term insomnia disorder
 Other insomnia disorder

2. Sleep-related breathing disorders
 Obstructive sleep apnea (OSA) disorders
 OSA, adult
 OSA, pediatric
 Central sleep apnea syndromes
 Central sleep apnea with Cheyne-Stokes breathing
 Central sleep apnea due to a medical disorder without Cheyne-Stokes breathing
 Central sleep apnea due to high altitude periodic breathing
 Central sleep apnea due to a medication or substance
 Primary central sleep apnea
 Primary central sleep apnea of infancy
 Primary central sleep apnea of prematurity
 Treatment-emergent central sleep apnea
 Sleep-related hypoventilation disorders
 Obesity hypoventilation syndrome
 Congenital central alveolar hypoventilation syndrome
 Late-onset central hypoventilation with hypothalamic dysfunction
 Idiopathic central alveolar hypoventilation
 Sleep-related hypoventilation due to a medication or substance
 Sleep-related hypoventilation due to a medical disorder
 Sleep-related hypoxemia disorder 
 Isolated symptoms and normal variants

3. Central disorders of hypersomnolence
 Narcolepsy type 1
 Narcolepsy type 2
 Idiopathic hypersomnia
 Kleine-Levin syndrome
 Hypersomnia due to a medical disorder
 Hypersomnia due to a medication or substance
 Hypersomnia associated with a psychiatric disorder
 Insufficient sleep syndrome

4. Circadian rhythm sleep-wake disorders
 Delayed sleep-wake phase disorder
 Advanced sleep-wake phase disorder
 Irregular sleep-wake rhythm disorder
 Non-24-h sleep-wake rhythm disorder
 Shift work disorder
 Jet lag disorder
 Circadian sleep-wake disorder not otherwise specified

5. Sleep-related movement disorders
 Restless legs syndrome
 Periodic limb movement disorder
 Sleep-related leg cramps
 Sleep-related bruxism
 Sleep-related rhythmic movement disorder
 Benign sleep myoclonus of infancy
 Propriospinal myoclonus at sleep onset
 Sleep-related movement disorder due to a medical disorder
 Sleep-related movement disorder due to a medication or substance
 Sleep-related movement disorder, unspecified
 Isolated symptoms and normal variants
 Excessive fragmentary myoclonus
 Hypnagogic foot tremor and alternating leg muscle activation
 Sleep starts (hypnic jerks)

6. Parasomnias
 NREM-related parasomnias
 Confusional arousals
 Sleepwalking
 Sleep terrors
 Sleep-related eating disorder
 REM-related parasomnias
 REM sleep behavior disorder
 Recurrent isolated sleep paralysis
 Nightmare disorder
 Other parasomnias
 Exploding head syndrome
 Sleep-related hallucinations
 Sleep enuresis
 Parasomnia due to a medical disorder
 Parasomnia due to a medication or substance
 Parasomnia, unspecified
 Isolated symptoms and normal variants
 Sleep talking

7. Other sleep disorders

International Classification of Disease (ICD)

ICD-7R 1955 
780.7 Disturbance of sleep

ICD-8 1965 
306.4 Specific disorder of sleep

780.6 Disturbance of sleep

ICD-9 1975

327 Organic sleep disorders

327.0 Organic disorders of initiating and maintaining sleep [organic insomnia] 
 327.00 Organic insomnia, unspecified
 327.01 Insomnia due to medical condition classified elsewhere
 327.02 Insomnia due to mental disorder
 327.09 Other organic insomnia

327.1 Organic disorder of excessive somnolence [organic hypersomnia] 
 327.10 Organic hypersomnia, unspecified
 327.11 Idiopathic hypersomnia with long sleep time
 327.12 Idiopathic hypersomnia without long sleep time
 327.13 Recurrent hypersomnia
 327.14 Hypersomnia due to medical condition classified elsewhere
 327.15 Hypersomnia due to mental disorder
 327.19 Other organic hypersomnia

327.2 Organic sleep apnea 
 327.20 Organic sleep apnea, unspecified
 327.21 Primary central sleep apnea
 327.22 High altitude periodic breathing
 327.23 Obstructive sleep apnea (adult)(pediatric)
 327.24 Idiopathic sleep related non-obstructive alveolar hypoventilation
 327.25 Congenital central alveolar hypoventilation syndrome
 327.26 Sleep related hypoventilation/hypoxemia in conditions classifiable elsewhere
 327.27 Central sleep apnea in conditions classified elsewhere
 327.29 Other organic sleep apnea

327.3 Circadian rhythm sleep disorder 
 327.30 Circadian rhythm sleep disorder, unspecified
 327.31 Circadian rhythm sleep disorder, delayed sleep phase type
 327.32 Circadian rhythm sleep disorder, advanced sleep phase type
 327.33 Circadian rhythm sleep disorder, irregular sleep-wake type
 327.34 Circadian rhythm sleep disorder, free-running type
 327.35 Circadian rhythm sleep disorder, jet lag type
 327.36 Circadian rhythm sleep disorder, shift work type
 327.37 Circadian rhythm sleep disorder in conditions classified elsewhere
 327.39 Other circadian rhythm sleep disorder

327.4 Organic parasomnia 
 327.40 Organic parasomnia, unspecified
 327.41 Confusional arousals
 327.42 REM sleep behavior disorder
 327.43 Recurrent isolated sleep paralysis
 327.44 Parasomnia in conditions classified elsewhere
 327.49 Other organic parasomnia

327.5 Organic sleep related movement disorders 
 327.51 Periodic limb movement disorder
 327.52 Sleep related leg cramps
 327.53 Sleep related bruxism
 327.59 Other organic sleep related movement disorders

327.8 Other organic sleep disorders

307.4 Specific disorders of sleep of nonorganic origin 
 307.40 Nonorganic sleep disorder, unspecified
 307.41 Transient disorder of initiating or maintaining sleep
 307.42 Persistent disorder of initiating or maintaining sleep
 307.43 Transient disorder of initiating or maintaining wakefulness
 307.44 Persistent disorder of initiating or maintaining wakefulness
 307.45 Circadian rhythm sleep disorder of nonorganic origin
 307.46 Sleep arousal disorder
 307.47 Other dysfunctions of sleep stages or arousal from sleep
 307.48 Repetitive intrusions of sleep
 307.49 Other specific disorders of sleep of nonorganic origin

780.5 Sleep disturbances 
 780.50 Sleep disturbance, unspecified
 780.51 Insomnia with sleep apnea, unspecified
 780.52 Insomnia, unspecified
 780.53 Hypersomnia with sleep apnea, unspecified
 780.54 Hypersomnia, unspecified
 780.55 Disruption of 24 hour sleep wake cycle, unspecified
 780.56 Dysfunctions associated with sleep stages or arousal from sleep
 780.57 Unspecified sleep apnea
 780.58 Sleep related movement disorder, unspecified
 780.59 Other sleep disturbances

292.85 Drug induced sleep disorders

ICD-NA (1997)

G47 Sleep disorders 
 Excl.: nocturnal myoclonus (G25.80), nightmares (F51.5), nonorganic sleep disorders (F51.-), sleep terrors (F51.4), sleepwalking (F51.3)

G47.0 Disorders of initiating and maintaining sleep [insomnias], Excl. altitudinal insomnia (T70.2)

G47.1 Disorders of excessive somnolence [hypersomnias]

G47.2 Disorders of the sleep-wake schedule 
 G47.20 Transient sleep wake schedule disorder
 G47.21 Advanced sleep phase disorder
 G47.22 Delayed sleep phase syndromes
 G47.23 Irregular sleep-wake pattern
 G47.24 Non 24 hour sleep wake cycle
 G47.28 Other disorder of sleep wake schedule

G47.3 Sleep apnoea 
 Sleep related respiratory failure (ondine)
 Excl. pickwickian syndrome (E66.2), sleep apnoea of newborn (P28.3)
 G47.30 Alveolar hypoventilation syndrome
 G47.31 Central sleep apnoea
 G47.32 Obstructive sleep apnoea
 G47.38 Other sleep apnoea

G47.4 Narcolepsy and cataplexy 
 G47.40 Narcolepsy
 G47.41 Cataplexy
 G47.42 Sleep paralysis
 G47.43 Hypnogogic and hypnopompic hallucination
 G47.44 Any combination of narcolepsy, cataplexy, Sleep paralysis, Hypnogogic and hypnopompic hallucination
 G47.48 Other forms of narcolepsy and cataplexy

G47.8 Other sleep disorders 
 Excl: Other sudden death, cause unknown (R96-)
 Sleep apnoea (G47.3)
 newborn (R96.-)
 Sudden infant death syndrome (R95)
 G47.80 Other REM sleep related parasomnias
 Excl. nightmares (F51.5), Sleep paralysis (G47.42 )
 G47.800 REM sleep related behavior disorder (phantasmagorias)
 G47.801 Impaired REM sleep related non painful penile erection
 G47.802 REM sleep related painful penile erection
 G47.803 REM sleep related cardiac sinus arrest
 G47.804 REM sleep related headache (use additional code if required to indicate type of headache)
 G47.81 Other non REM sleep related parasomnias
 Excl: benign neonatal sleep syndrome (G25.37)
 G47.810 Sleep related bruxism
 G47.811 Sleep related enuresis
 G47.812 Non-REM-sleep related abnormal swallowing syndrome
 G47.813 Nocturnal paroxysmal dystonia
 G47.82 Sleep arousal disorders, confusional arousal, Sleep drunkenness
 G47.83 Sleep-wake transition disorders
 Excl. nocturnal leg cramps (R25.20)
 G47.830 Sleep related rhythmic movement disorder, head-banging (jactatio capitis noctunus)
 G47.831 Sleep starts
 G47.832 Sleepwalking
 G47.84 Kleine-Levin syndrome, Recurrent hypersomnia
 G47.88 Other specified sleep disorders

G47.9 Sleep disorder, unspecified

F51 Nonorganic sleep disorders 
 Excl.: sleep disorders (organic) (G47.-)

F51.0 Nonorganic insomnia Excl.: insomnia (organic) (G47.0)

F51.1 Nonorganic hypersomnia Excl.: hypersomnia (organic) (G47.1), narcolepsy (G47.4)

F51.2 Nonorganic disorder of the sleep-wake schedule 
 Psychogenic inversion of: 
 circadian
 nyctohemeral
 sleep rhythm
 Excl.: disorders of the sleep-wake schedule (organic) (G47.2)

F51.3 Sleepwalking [somnambulism]

F51.4 Sleep terrors [night terrors]

F51.5 Nightmares, Dream anxiety disorder

F51.8 Other nonorganic sleep disorders

F51.9 Nonorganic sleep disorder, unspecified, Emotional sleep disorder NOS

P28.3 Primary sleep apnoea of newborn 
 Sleep apnoea of newborn:
 central
 NOS
 obstructive

P28.4 Other apnoea of newborn 
 Apnoea (of):
 newborn, obstructive
 prematurity Excl.: obstructive sleep apnoea of newborn (P28.3)

ICD-10-CM 2016

G47 Sleep disorders

G47.0 Insomnia 
 G47.00 ...... unspecified
 G47.01 ...... due to medical condition
 G47.09 Other insomnia

G47.1 Hypersomnia 
 G47.10 ...... unspecified
 G47.11 Idiopathic hypersomnia with long sleep time
 G47.12 Idiopathic hypersomnia without long sleep time
 G47.13 Recurrent hypersomnia
 G47.14 ...... due to medical condition
 G47.19 Other hypersomnia

G47.2 Circadian rhythm sleep disorders 
 G47.20 Circadian rhythm sleep disorder, unspecified type
 G47.21 Circadian rhythm sleep disorder, delayed sleep phase type
 G47.22 Circadian rhythm sleep disorder, advanced sleep phase type
 G47.23 Circadian rhythm sleep disorder, irregular sleep wake type
 G47.24 Circadian rhythm sleep disorder, free running type
 G47.25 Circadian rhythm sleep disorder, jet lag type
 G47.26 Circadian rhythm sleep disorder, shift work type
 G47.27 Circadian rhythm sleep disorder in conditions classified elsewhere
 G47.29 Other circadian rhythm sleep disorder

G47.3 Sleep apnea 
 G47.30 ...... unspecified
 G47.31 Primary central sleep apnea
 G47.32 High altitude periodic breathing
 G47.33 Obstructive sleep apnea (adult) (pediatric)
 G47.34 Idiopathic sleep related nonobstructive alveolar hypoventilation
 G47.35 Congenital central alveolar hypoventilation syndrome
 G47.36 Sleep related hypoventilation in conditions classified elsewhere
 G47.37 Central sleep apnea in conditions classified elsewhere
 G47.39 Other sleep apnea

G47.4 Narcolepsy and cataplexy 
 G47.41 Narcolepsy
 G47.411 ...... with cataplexy
 G47.419 ...... without cataplexy
 G47.42 Narcolepsy in conditions classified elsewhere
 G47.421 ...... with cataplexy
 G47.429 ...... without cataplexy

G47.5 Parasomnia 
 G47.50 ...... unspecified
 G47.51 Confusional arousals
 G47.52 REM sleep behavior disorder
 G47.53 Recurrent isolated sleep paralysis
 G47.54 ...... in conditions classified elsewhere
 G47.59 Other parasomnia

G47.6 Sleep related movement disorders 
 G47.61 Periodic limb movement disorder
 G47.62 Sleep related leg cramps
 G47.63 Sleep related bruxism
 G47.69 Other sleep related movement disorders

G47.8 Other sleep disorders

G47.9 Sleep disorder, unspecified

F51 Sleep disorders not due to a substance or known physiological condition

F51.0 Insomnia not due to a substance or known physiological condition 
 F51.01 Primary insomnia
 F51.02 Adjustment insomnia
 F51.03 Paradoxical insomnia
 F51.04 Psychophysiologic insomnia
 F51.05 Insomnia due to other mental disorder
 F51.09 Other insomnia not due to a substance or known physiological condition

F51.1 Hypersomnia not due to a substance or known physiological condition 
 F51.11 Primary hypersomnia
 F51.12 Insufficient sleep syndrome
 F51.13 Hypersomnia due to other mental disorder
 F51.19 Other hypersomnia not due to a substance or known physiological condition

F51.3 Sleepwalking [somnambulism]

F51.4 Sleep terrors [night terrors]

F51.5 Nightmare disorder

F51.8 Other sleep disorders not due to a substance or known physiological condition

F51.9 Sleep disorder not due to a substance or known physiological condition, unspecified

P28.3 
Applicable To
 Central sleep apnea of newborn
 Obstructive sleep apnea of newborn
 Sleep apnea of newborn NOS
Approximate Synonyms
 Neonatal primary apnea
 Primary apnea in the newborn
 Sleep apnea, primary, neonatal

ICD-11-Beta - 10 Sleep Wake Disorder 2016

Insomnia disorders 
 8A00 Chronic insomnia
 8A01 Short-term insomnia
 8A02 Disorders of initiating and maintaining sleep
 8A0Y Other specified insomnia disorders
 8A0Z Insomnia disorders,  unspecified

Sleep-related movement disorders 
 8A10 Restless legs syndrome
 8A11 Secondary restless legs syndrome
 8A12 Periodic limb movements disorder
 8A13 Sleep-related bruxism
 8A14 Sleep-related leg cramps
 8A15 Sleep-related rhythmic movement disorder
 8A16 Benign sleep myoclonus of infancy
 8A1Y Other specified sleep-related movement disorders
 8A1Z Sleep-related movement disorders, unspecified

8A20 Hypersomnolence disorders 
 8A20.1 Narcolepsy, Type 1
 8A20.2 Narcolepsy, Type 2
 8A20.3 Idiopathic hypersomnolence disorder
 8A20.4 Kleine-Levin syndrome
 8A20.5 Behaviourally induced hypersomnolence
 8A20.6 Hypersomnolence due to substances including medications
 8A20.Y Other specified hypersomnolence disorders
 8A20.Z Hypersomnolence disorders,  unspecified

Sleep-related breathing disorders 
 8A30 Central sleep apnoeas
 8A31 Obstructive sleep apnoea
 8A32 Sleep-related hypoventilation or hypoxemia disorders
 8A3Y Other specified sleep-related breathing disorders
 8A3Z Sleep-related breathing disorders, unspecified

Circadian rhythm sleep-wake disorders 
 8A40 Circadian rhythm sleep-wake disorder, delayed type
 8A41 Circadian rhythm sleep-wake disorder,  advanced type
 8A42 Circadian rhythm sleep-wake disorder, irregular sleep-wake rhythm type
 8A43 Circadian rhythm sleep-wake disorder, non-24 hour type
 8A44 Circadian rhythm sleep-wake disorder, shift work type
 8A45 Circadian rhythm sleep-wake disorder, jet lag type
 8A4Y Other specified circadian rhythm sleep-wake disorders
 8A4Z Circadian rhythm sleep-wake disorders, unspecified

Parasomnia disorders

Disorders of arousal in non-REM sleep 
 8A50 Confusional arousals
 8A51 Sleepwalking disorder
 8A52 Sleep terrors
 8A5Y Other specified disorders of arousal in non-REM sleep
 8A5Z Disorders of arousal in non-REM sleep, unspecified
 8A60 Sleep-related eating disorder

8A61 REM sleep behavior disorder 
 8A62 Recurrent isolated sleep paralysis
 8A63 Nightmare disorder 8A63 Nightmare disorder
 8A64 Hypnogogic exploding head syndrome
 8A65 Recurrent isolated sleep-related hallucinations

8A66 Parasomnia disorder due to substances including medications 
 8A6Y Other specified parasomnia disorders
 8A6Z Parasomnia disorders,  unspecified
 7B60.1 Nocturnal enuresis
 8A70 Disorders of the sleep-wake schedule
 8A71 Parasomnia
 8A72 Sleeptalking
 8A7Y Other specified sleep-wake disorders
 8A7Z Sleep-wake disorders, unspecified
 ME21 Dyssomnia

DSM Classification of Sleep Disorders 
 Diagnostic and Statistical Manual (DSM) classification of sleep disorder was first introduced in 1968.

DSM II - 1968 
 Disorders of Sleep

DSM III - 1980 
 Other disorders with physical manifestation
 Sleep walking
 Sleep terror

DSM III-R 1987

Sleep Disorder

Dysomnias (disorders of amount, quality or time of sleep) 
 Insomnia
 Hypersomnia
 Sleep wake schedule disorder

Parasomnia (abnormal event during sleep) 
 Nightmare disorder
 Sleep terror
 Sleep walking

DSM IV TR Sleep Disorders

DSM-5 Sleep Wake Disorders

Major changes from DSM IV 
Sleep-wake disorders comprise 11 diagnostic groups:"
 M00 Insomnia disorder
 M01 Hypersomnolence Disorder
 M02 Narcolepsy/Hypocretin Deficiency
 M03 Obstructive Sleep Apnea Hypopnea Syndrome
 M04 Central Sleep Apnea
 M05 Sleep-Related Hypoventilation
 M06 Circadian Rhythm Sleep-Wake Disorder
 M07 Disorder of Arousal
 M08 Nightmare Disorder
 M09 Rapid Eye Movement Sleep Behavior Disorder
 M10 Restless Legs Syndrome
 M11 Substance-Induced Sleep disorder
 Sleep-Wake Disorders Not Elsewhere Classified
 Insomnia Disorder Not Elsewhere Classified
 Major Somnolence Disorder (Hypersomnia Not Elsewhere Classified) The following specifiers apply to Sleep-Wake Disorders where indicated:  Specify if: Episodic, Persistent, Recurrent  Specify if: Acute, Subacute, Persistent  Specify current severity: Mild, Moderate, Severe

References

External links 

Sleep disorders
Medical classification